is a Japanese football player. He plays for Japan Football League club Honda FC.He is Matsuzaka Generation.

Playing career
Furuhashi started his career with semi-professional Japan Football League team Honda FC in 1999, while also working as a factory worker. He made his debut for the club in a 5–0 home win over Kokushikan University. He made over 100 league appearances and scored 85 league goals in his time with Honda, and is still a popular figure at the club.

In the summer of 2004, Furuhashi signed his first full-professional contract with J1 League team Cerezo Osaka. He scored on his Cerezo debut, a 4–3 win over FC Tokyo. He had an instant impact and quickly became a regular at Nagai Park. During his time there he formed notable strike partnerships with Hiroaki Morishima, Akinori Nishizawa, Shinji Kagawa and Rui Komatsu. Furuhashi moved to Montedio Yamagata in January 2009, after scoring 44 goals in 146 appearances for Cerezo.

Furuhashi signed for Shonan Bellmare on 28 November 2011. He made his Bellmare debut as a 2nd-half substitute in a 2–1 home win over Kyoto Sanga FC on the opening day of the 2012 season.

Club statistics
Updated 1 January 2018.

Honours 
 Honda
 Japan Football League: 2001, 2002, 2014, 2016, 2017
 Individual
 Japan Football League top-scorer: 2003
 J.League Best XI: 2005

References

External links

1980 births
Living people
Association football people from Shizuoka Prefecture
Japanese footballers
J1 League players
J2 League players
Japan Football League players
Honda FC players
Cerezo Osaka players
Montedio Yamagata players
Shonan Bellmare players
Association football forwards